Köyük (also, Göyük, Gëyuk, and Keyuk) is a village in the Yevlakh Rayon of Azerbaijan.  The village forms part of the municipality of Qaramanlı.

References 

Populated places in Yevlakh District